The Many Ghosts of Doctor Graves was an American supernatural-anthology comic book published by Charlton Comics, often featuring stories by writer-artist Steve Ditko. The eponymous Dr. M. T. Graves was a fictional character who hosted the stories in each issue of this title, and very occasionally took part in a tale.

Sister titles, with many of the same creators, particularly Ditko, were the Charlton anthologies Ghost Manor (with host Mr. Bones) and its successor, Ghostly Haunts (with host Winnie the Witch); Ghostly Tales (with host Mr. L. Dedd, later I. M. Dedd); and Haunted (with hosts Impy and then Baron Weirwulf).

The series won the 1967 Alley Award for Best Fantasy/SF/Supernatural Title.

Publication history
Following his introduction as Dr. M. T. Graves in Charlton Comics' Ghostly Tales #55 (cover-dated May 1966) in the three-page story "The Ghost Fighter" by writer-artist Ernie Bache, the character went on to host his own anthology title, The Many Ghosts of Doctor Graves. The series ran 72 issues (May 1967 - May 1982), generally published bimonthly.

In issue #5, the fourth-wall-breaking story "Best of All Possible Worlds" by Steve Skeates and Jim Aparo  involved a reader who's pulled into the pages of the comic book, and has to decide whether to venture back to the real world.

Following issue #60 (Jan. 1977), the title went on hiatus for seven months until issue #61 (Aug. 1977) before being canceled with #65 (May 1978). Charlton revived the title three years later with #66 (May 1981) before canceling it once more six issues later. 

Three additional issues consisting solely of reprints, and titled simply Dr. Graves, were published as issues #73-75 (Sept. 1985 - Jan. 1986).

Among the artists whose work appeared were Steve Ditko, following his falling-out with Marvel Comics; newcomer Jim Aparo, later to be one of Batman's signature artists; regular Charlton talents including Vince Alascia, Pat Boyette, Pete Morisi, Rocke Mastroserio, and Charles Nicholas; and such others as Rich Larson, Don Newton and Tom Sutton. The cover of issue #54 (Dec. 1975) marks one of the earliest professional works of John Byrne.

Writers on the title included Ditko, Steve Skeates, Mike Pellowski, and the prolific, generally uncredited staff writer Joe Gill.

Awards
The Many Ghosts of Doctor Graves won the 1967 Alley Award for Best Fantasy/SF/Supernatural Title.

References

External links

Charlton Comics titles
Defunct American comics
Horror comics
Fantasy comics
Mystery comics
Comics characters introduced in 1966
1967 comics debuts
Comics by Steve Ditko